The 1967 Mediterranean Games football tournament was the 5th edition of the Mediterranean Games men's football tournament. The football tournament was held in Tunis, Tunisia between the 7–17 September 1967 as part of the 1967 Mediterranean Games.

Participating teams
The following countries have participated for the final tournament:

Venues

Squads

Group stage
All times local : CET (UTC+1)

Group A

Group B

Second place group playoff

Spain won coin toss.

Knockout stage

Semifinals

Third place match

Final

Italy and France joint winners, the referee held a coin toss won by Italy, but the International Committee of Mediterranean Games (CIJM) annulled that decision and declared both teams winners.

Tournament classification

References 

1967
Sports at the 1967 Mediterranean Games
1967 in African football
1967 in Asian football
1967